Hu Dandan (born 10 March 1989 in Xuzhou) is a Chinese powerlifter and former wheelchair tennis player. She won the gold medal at the women's 45 kg event at the 2016 Summer Paralympics, with 107 kilograms. She won the gold medal at the women's 50 kg event at the 2020 Summer Paralympics, with 120 kilograms.

References

External links
 

1989 births
Living people
Chinese powerlifters
Female powerlifters
Paralympic powerlifters of China
Paralympic wheelchair tennis players of China
Paralympic gold medalists for China
Paralympic medalists in powerlifting
Powerlifters at the 2016 Summer Paralympics
Powerlifters at the 2020 Summer Paralympics
Medalists at the 2016 Summer Paralympics
Medalists at the 2020 Summer Paralympics
Paralympians from Pizhou
Sportspeople from Xuzhou
21st-century Chinese women